The Art Goblins are an English alternative rock band featuring Art Brut members Eddie Argos and Jasper "Jeff" Future.

History

The band was originally formed in Bournemouth in the 1990s by Argos when at sixth form college; after the initial members apart from Argos (vocals, vacuum cleaner) and Future (rhythm guitar) left to go to university they were replaced by Matt Ruffalo on guitar, Nicky Biscuit on keyboard, and Pab Gigolovski on bass guitar.

The band became moribund when this second wave of members also left for university; Argos later formed Art Brut with Chris Chinchilla and Ian Catskilkin (another member of the Bournemouth music scene); when Chinchilla left he would be replaced with Future. The Art Goblins have subsequently performed a number of reunion shows.  A 2005 gig at the Buffalo Bar was described as an "exhilarating performance" by Artrocker.

Members
The Art Goblins are:
 Eddie Argos (lead vocals)
 Mutt Ruffalo (lead guitar)
 Jasper "Jeff" Future (guitar, backing vocals)
 Nicky Biscuit (keyboard)
 Pab Gigolovski (bass guitar)
 Bolt Jenkins (drums)
 Keith Totp (Vibe, violins, other)

Discography

Albums
"Fuck Rock, Let's Chart" (self-released, 1988)

Singles
Fuck The M.S.P. / My Conscience Died With Those Prostitutes! (split 7-inch with Billy Ruffian) Filthy Little Angels Singles Club, (May 2007)

Compilations
Audio Antihero Presents: "Some.Alternate.Universe" for FSID - contributes "Disco"

References

External links
Official website

English rock music groups
Musical groups from Bournemouth